Alpha Delta Phi Society, also known as The Society or Adelphi Society, is a United States Greek-letter literary and social society that is gender-inclusive. The society formed in 1992 when four chapters withdrew from the all-male Alpha Delta Phi fraternity. Legally, the two groups are separate entities with different ideologies but continue to share traditions.

History

Alpha Delta Phi 

Samuel Eells and four others founded the literary society Alpha Delta Phi at Hamilton College in 1832. The fraternity quickly expanded to other colleges across the United States and in Canada.

Coed debate 
In 1968, the California chapter at the University of California, Berkeley began initiating women in violation of the fraternity's constitution. Soon, the Chicago chapter at Northwestern University also started admitting females. At the Alpha Delta Phi national convention in 1972, the California chapter proposed an amendment to the constitution, eliminating the all-male restriction and allowing women to become full members. The debate was contentious, with most chapters opposed to the change. As a result, the proposed amendment was tabled. 

Brother Robert Price was tasked with finding a solution to the conflict.  More Alpha Delta Phi chapters became coed, including Brunonian chapter at Brown University and the Middletown chapter at Wesleyan University in 1973. That same year, Price came up with the Brown Compromise that allowed women to join as "local" members but not as national fraternity initiates.

The Bowdoin chapter at Bowdoin College went coed in 1976, followed by the Columbia chapter at Columbia University and the Amherst chapter at Amherst College. However, the California and Chicago chapters returned to male-only status. 

In March 1975, the Brunonian chapter elected the first female president in the fraternity's history. This resulted in a great deal of media coverage and hostility from the fraternity and its alumni. Alpha Delta Phi sent a letter stating its plans to suspend the Brunonian chapter at the next national meeting. In 1978, the coed chapters held a Co-Ed Caucus in Middletown to develop strategies. They developed the home rule policy and introduced it at the 1978 national conference. However, the proposed home rule policy was defeated; it would have given each chapter the right to decide whether or not to initiate women fully. 

At the 1981 convention, the Trinity Compromise was adopted, allowing those "non-constitutionally qualified for membership" to be inducted as full members of a chapter and participate in the initiation ceremony as long as they did not hold an elected office or vote on new members. Although women could now be full members of individual chapters, they could only be associate members of the national fraternity. The coed chapters immediately began circumventing the resolution, allowing women to serve as officers by creating new offices or submitting male names to the national fraternity. Some chapters submitted female entries to the fraternity's literary contest under male members' names.

In 1985, female members from the Middletown chapter were denied entry to a business session at the national convention. Not only were the women not allowed to stay for the business meeting, but there was also pushing and shoving when they tried to participate in ceremonies at the annual banquet. The next year at the annual convention, the Washington chapter and the Berkeley chapter presented a resolution to revoke the charter of any chapter that initiated women after August 1990.

In 1988, half of the Middletown chapter members were female. By the next year, the option of splitting Alpha Delta Phi had supporters. In 1989, the Brunonian chapter passed a resolution to cut ties with the national fraternity if it did not stop its discrimination of women by the fall of 1990. In November, the  Stanford University chapter became the first fraternity on its campus to go coed, initiating fifteen women.

At the 1990 national convention, the adoption of the Berkeley-Washington resolution was delayed in favor of a new proposal to create two separate, but connected, organizations. According to this proposal, Alpha Delta Phi would remain an all-male fraternity and the new Alpha Delta Phi Society would consist of the coed chapters and any interested all-male chapters. This proposal convinced the Brunonian chapter to delay its disassociation by another year.

In 1991, the Bowdoin chapter offered its local female members full fraternity status to comply with the college's new equality guidelines. Although the chapter had been coed for fifteen years, its compliance with the college's guidelines put it at odds with the national fraternity that had yet to create an official solution for its coed chapters.

The Society 
In August 1992 at the fraternity's annual convention in Brainerd, Minnesota, the "Agreement Between the Alpha Delta Phi Fraternity and the Alpha Delta Phi Society" was ratified. Under this agreement, the fraternity and the society separated and became independent, legal entities with their own governing bodies. The two organizations would not share membership, except for male members of the society chapters who joined the fraternity before 1992. The groups would share the license for the Greek letters ΑΔΦ and intellectual property, including history and songs. The agreement also limited where new chapters could be established and the society's use of the name Alpha Delta Phi. As a result, some chapters could not use the society name, instead operating as the Adelphi Society.

With the adoption of the agreement, the Brown, Columbia, Stanford, and Wesleyan chapters withdrew from the fraternity.  These four chapters established the Alpha Delta Phi Society that granted each of its chapters home rule to determine its gender makeup. The Bowdoin chapter joined at the society's first convention in 1993. The society adopted a constitution in October 1997 at its annual convention, ratifying it in 1998. Its first affiliate was formed in 1994 at Middlebury College. Between 2008 and 20015, affiliate chapters and chapters opened at Harvard University, the University of New Hampshire, the University of Pennsylvania, Binghamton University, George Washington University, Rensselaer Polytechnic Institute, and Ursinus College.

In August 2017 at the Alpha Delta Phi fraternity's annual convention in Minneapolis, Minnesota, the fraternity and the society replaced the 1992 agreement. The new agreement brought greater parity and removed geographic restrictions on the use of the name Alpha Delta Phi Society. The language of the agreement was also simplified.

Nomenclature and insignia 

The Society continues to use the badge and crest of the Alpha Delta Phi fraternity.

Chapters
The Alpha Delta Phi Society has seven active chapters, three graduate chapters, and three affiliate chapters. All chapters are gender-inclusive. Active chapters are noted in bold; inactive chapters are noted in italic.

Notes

Activities
As a literary society, members write, read, and discuss literature. It also publishes a literary magazine, Echoes From On High. Its members participate in undergraduate and graduate literary competitions, supported by the Samuel Eells Literary and Educational Foundation, a separate nonprofit corporation. The Bowdoin chapter also hosts the Alpha Delta Phi Visiting Writers Series. Other chapters have co-hosted the production of a play or co-sponsored the Queer/Art/Poetics Conference.

The chapters also hold social events, such as open mic nights and band concerts. The society also participates in charitable activities, such as Blind Date With a Book or Book Fairs which raise funds for various organizations, including Books Behind Bars and Seacoast Reads.

Chapter houses 
The Wesleyan University chapter house was designed by Charles A. Rich in 1906 in collegiate colonial revival style. The house is located at 185 High Street in Middletown, also the site of the chapter's 1884 house that was demolished in 1904. An addition was added to the rear of the building in 1925.

Alumni organizations 
The society has numerous regional graduate organizations.

Notable members
Some alumni of the founding society chapters joined before the schism between fraternity and society; they are listed as notables for both organizations. This issue was deliberated as part of the separation agreement between the organizations, allowing both to claim the  alumni from the earlier era. 

John Perry Barlow (Wesleyan University, 1969) – poet, essayist, lyricist for the Grateful Dead, co-founder of Electronic Frontier Foundation
Arlo Bates  (Bowdoin College, 18xx) – novelist, poet
 Samuel Blatchford (Columbia University, 1837) – U.S. Supreme Court justice
 Charles S. Bradley (Brown University, 1838) –  chief justice of the Rhode Island Supreme Court
 Joshua Chamberlain (Bowdoin College, 1852) – Governor of Maine; president of Bowdoin College
John David Clifford Jr. (Bowdoin College, 18xx) – district judge of the United States District Court for the District of Maine
Buzzy Cohen (Columbia University, 2009) – Jeopardy! Tournament of Champions winner in 2017
George Fisk Comfort (Bowdoin College, 1857) – art historian, founder of Metropolitan Museum of Art and Everson Museum of Art
George William Curtis (Brown University, 1852)  – writer, journalist, abolitionist, political editor of Harper's Weekly
Thomas Ewing Jr. (Brown University, 1856) – general U.S. Army, congressman, chief justice Kansas Supreme Court
 William Russell Grace (Columbia University, 1900) – founder of W. R. Grace and Company
 Abram W. Harris (Wesleyan University, 1880) – president of Northwestern University and University of Maine
 Roger Howell Jr. (Bowdoin College, 1958) – president of Bowdoin College
 John Jay (Columbia University, 1836) – abolitionist, diplomat, lawyer
 Thomas Jenckes (Brown University, 1838) – congressman
 Elijah Kellogg  (Bowdoin College, 1840) – author
 Pagan Kennedy (Wesleyan University, 1984) – author, pioneer of 1990s zine movement
 Otto Kerner Jr. (Brown University, 1930) – Governor of Illinois
 Goodwin Knight (Stanford University) – Governor of California
 George V. N. Lothrop (Brown University, 1838) – Michigan Attorney General
 Monica Louwerens (Wesleyan University, 1995) – actress and Miss America contestant
 Robert Ludlum (Wesleyan University, 1951) – novelist
 George Frederick Magoun (Bowdoin College, 1841) – president of Iowa College
 Thomas Merton (Columbia University, 1938) – Trappist monk, theologian
 Barry Mills (Bowdoin College, 1972) – president of Bowdoin College
 Marcus Morton (Bowdoin College, 1838) – chief justice of the Massachusetts Supreme Judicial Court
 David Packard (Stanford University, 1934) – founder of the Hewlett-Packard Computer Corporation
 Daniel Pearl (Stanford University, 1985) – journalist, The Wall Street Journal editor
 J. Meredith Read (Brown University, 1858) – U.S. Minister to Greece, Consul General to France and Algeria
 John D. Rockefeller Jr. (Brown University, 1897) – director, Standard Oil and U.S. Steel
 Michael S. Roth (Wesleyan University, 1978) – president of Wesleyan University
 George Washington Shonk (Wesleyan University, 1873) – U.S. House of Representatives
 Herbert B. Shonk (Wesleyan University, 1873) – New York State Assembly, attorney
 Watson G. Squire (Wesleyan University, 18xx) – U.S. Senator, Ohio Attorney General

Ben Stein (Columbia University, 1966) – actor and author
Charles Wardell Stiles (Wesleyan University, 18xx)  – zoologist, parasitologist with U.S. Department of Agriculture
 George Templeton Strong (Columbia University, 1838) – prolific diarist

See also
 Alpha Delta Phi fraternity
 List of Alpha Delta Phi chapters
 List of Alpha Delta Phi members
 List of social fraternities and sororities

References

 
Student societies in the United States
Student organizations established in 1992
Literary societies